Salta is a province of Argentina, located in the northwest of the country. Neighboring provinces are from the east clockwise Formosa, Chaco, Santiago del Estero, Tucumán and Catamarca. It also surrounds Jujuy. To the north it borders Bolivia and Paraguay and to the west lies Chile.

History
Before the Spanish conquest, numerous native peoples (now called Diaguitas and Calchaquíes) lived in the valleys of what is now Salta Province; they formed many different tribes, the Quilmes and Humahuacas among them, which all shared the Cacán language.  The Atacamas lived in the Puna, and the Wichís (Matacos), in the Chaco region.

The first conquistador to venture into the area was Diego de Almagro in 1535; he was followed by Diego de Rojas. Hernando de Lerma founded San Felipe de Lerma in 1582, following orders of the viceroy Francisco de Toledo, Count of Oropesa; the name of the city was soon changed to "San Felipe de Salta".  By 1650, the city had around five hundred inhabitants.

An intendency of "Salta del Tucumán" was created within the Viceroyalty of the Río de la Plata.  In 1774, San Ramón de La Nueva Orán was founded between Salta and Tarija (Tarija was added to the intendency later, in 1807).  In 1783, in recognition of the growing importance of the city, the capital of the intendency of Salta del Tucumán was moved from San Miguel de Tucumán to Salta.

The battle of Salta in 1813 freed the territory from Spain, but occasional attacks were mounted from the Viceroyalty of Peru as late as 1826.  Gervasio de Posadas created the Province of Salta in 1814, containing the current provinces of Salta, Jujuy, and parts of southern Bolivia and northern Chile.

Exploiting internal Argentine conflicts that arose after the Argentine Declaration of Independence, Bolivia annexed Tarija in 1826. In 1834, Jujuy withdrew from Salta and became a separate province.  The borders of Salta were further reduced in 1900, with the loss of Yacuiba to Bolivia.

The National Government of Los Andes, constituted from the province in 1902 with a capital at San Antonio de los Cobres, was returned to Salta Province in 1943 as the Department of Los Andes.

Antonio Alice's painting, La muerte de Güemes, which received a Gold Medal at the Centenary Exposition, is on display at the offices of the Salta Provincial Government.

Geography

The main rivers of the province are the Pilcomayo, Bermejo, and the Juramento, which later becomes the Salado River. Salta Province is located at a geologically active region, and suffers from occasional earthquakes. There have been four earthquakes of note in the province:
In 1692, registering 7.0 on the Richter magnitude scale, and at IX (Violent) on the Mercalli intensity scale, 
In 1844, registering 6.5 on the Richter magnitude scale, and VII (Very strong) Mercalli intensity,
In 1948, registering 7.0 on the Moment magnitude scale (MMS), and IX (Violent) Mercalli intensity, and
In 2010, registering 6.1 or 6.3 (MMS), and VI (Strong) Mercalli intensity.
The 1692 earthquake was the inspiration for Salta's annual citywide festival, held on 16 September, in honor of El Señor y la Virgen del Milagro.

Climate

Although Salta Province is located near the Tropic of Capricorn, it has a wide range of climates due to variation in altitude and the influence of orography. The orientation of the Andes influences the distribution of precipitation within the province.

The easternmost parts of the province have a hot semi-arid climate (Köppen BSh) with a rainy season in the summer. Temperatures can reach up to  during summer, while they can fall down to  during winter.

The first slopes of the Andes force the moist, easterly winds to rise, provoking very high condensation leading to the formation of clouds that generate copious amounts of rain. Most of the precipitation is concentrated in the summer, with winters being dry. The high rainfall on these first slopes creates a thick jungle that extends in a narrow strip along these ranges, creating an area of great species diversity. At higher altitudes on these slopes, the climate is cooler and more humid, with the vegetation consisting of deciduous and pine trees.

Between the high altitudes to the west and the low plains to the east lie the valleys. The climate of these valleys is either humid subtropical with dry winters (Köppen Cwa) or subtropical highland (Cwb), favouring human settlement and agricultural activities. Mean temperatures exceed  during the summer, while during winter, they are below .

Several salt flats exist in this area.

The highest altitudes found in the western parts of the province have a cool arid climate (Köppen BWk), with large diurnal ranges (temperature range between day and night).

Economy
Salta's economy is relatively underdeveloped, yet diverse.  Its economy in 2006 was estimated at US$5.141 billion or, US$4,764 per capita, 45% below the national average. In 2012, its economy was estimated at $30.613 billion pesos (about US$6.743 billion) or $23,971 pesos (about US$5,280) per capita.

Manufacturing plays a significant role in Salta, adding 20% to the economy. Gas and petroleum from the Tartagal, Aguas Blancas, Madrejones and Campo Durán centres is transported to Buenos Aires and Rosario by pipes. There is also an oil refinery located at Campo Durán. Mining includes uranium at Iruya, La Poma and San Carlos; and silver at the Diablillos mine.

Agriculture and its derived industries are still an important activity in the province, adding over 10% to output. Tobacco, sugar cane and viticulture are the most important and produce most of the exports from the area. Other crops mostly for local consumption are maize, beans, citrus, bananas, and tomatoes. The sugar cane is processed in plants in Salta before it is sent to the rest of Argentina and other countries. The plant in San Martín de Tabacal is the most important of them. The famous wines of the Valles Calchaquíes region (mainly Torrontés, Malbec and Cabernet Sauvignon) near Cafayate are produced in numerous vineyards of diverse sizes. American breeds of cattle are raised only on the humid subtropical east, along with some sheep and goats.

Tourism

The Salta province is home to a number of natural, social and historic attractions.

The provincial capital city, also named Salta and nicknamed "La Linda" ("The beautiful") is both an important tourist destination, and the centre point for visiting the rest of the province. The city holds different attractions; among them are its colonial houses and cathedral, and the Museo de Arqueología de Alta Montaña de Salta that holds the three frozen Inca mummies found at the Llullaillaco volcano and known as the Children of Llullaillaco .

The Tren a las Nubes ("Train to the Clouds") crosses canyons and cliffs before arriving at the 3,775 metres altitude (12,500 feet) of San Antonio de los Cobres. The red-rock formations of the Valles Calchaquíes and the wine-town of Cafayate are the second most visited place in the province. Many visit the Cachi mountains and the villages (such as Payogasta) around it.

There are three national parks in Salta: El Rey National Park in the Yungas jungle, Baritú National Park and Los Cardones National Park.

Demographics

It constitutes 3.0% of the total population in Argentina. The most populous indigenous groups in the province are the Wichí, which make up 24.9% of the total indigenous population followed by the Kolla (21.6%), and the Guaraní (13.7%). As well, 4,189 persons declared themselves to be Afro-Argentine.

The province hosts a diverse foreign community: Christian Levantines of Syrian-Lebanese origin, Spaniards and Italians make up the largest groups. A small Ukrainian community has been there since the collapse of the Soviet Union and an Indian Sikh community has been living in Rosario de la Frontera since the 1940s. Other foreign people settled in the province are the Greek Cypriots, the Chinese, the Germans, the Francs, the Chileans, the Bolivians, the Paraguayans and the Slavs from the Adriatic (mainly Serbs and Croats). The Jewish community has a synagogue and the Muslims have a mosque, both in Salta City. Salta's Jews are mostly of Ashkenazim origin, but there are also a few Sefardim families.

Politics

The province is governed as representative and republican form of government. The provincial government is divided into three branches: the executive, headed by a popularly elected governor, who appoints the cabinet; the legislative; and the judiciary, headed by the Supreme Court.

The Constitution of Salta Province forms the formal law of the province.

In Argentina, the most important law enforcement organization is the Argentine Federal Police but the additional work is carried out by the Salta Provincial Police.

Political division

The province is divided in 23 departments, containing 59 municipalities. The capital of the province is the city of Salta, which is where the provincial government is located at.

Villages

See also

 1948 Salta earthquake

References

External links

  Salta Province official website
  Salta Province official portal
  Tourist Secretary
  Salta.com
  Nuevo Diario de Salta
  Universidad Nacional de Salta
  Welcome Salta
 

 
Provinces of Argentina
States and territories established in 1814
1814 establishments in Argentina